Amadora Este station is part of the Blue Line of the Lisbon Metro and is located on the east side of Amadora.

History
The station opened on 15 May 2004 in conjunction with the Alfornelos station, and it is located on Praça São Silvestre. Built over it is an important bus terminal.

The architectural design of the station is by Leopoldo de Almeida Rosa.

Connections

Suburban Buses

Vimeca / Lisboa Transportes 
 101 Lisboa (Colégio Militar) ⇄ Tercena
 104 Almargem do Bispo ⇄ Falagueira (Estação)
 106 Falagueira (Estação) ⇄ Carcavelos (Praia)
 132 A-da-Beja (Largo) ⇄ Lisboa (Colégio Militar)
 142 Casal da Mira (Dolce Vita Tejo) ↔ Lisboa (Colégio Militar) 
 154 Amadora (Hospital) - Circulação
 155 Amadora (Hospital) - Circulação
 162 Algés (Estação) ⇄ Falagueira (Estação)
 163 Lisboa (Colégio Militar) ⇄ Massamá (Casal do Olival) 
 186 Amadora (Hospital) ⇄ Falagueira (Estação)
 189 Amadora (Estação Sul)]] ⇄ Falagueira (Estação)

See also
 List of Lisbon metro stations

References

External links

Blue Line (Lisbon Metro) stations
Railway stations opened in 2004